"I'm Comin' Home" is a song written by Tommy James and Bob King and performed by James featuring The Stephentown Singers.  The song was the follow-up single after James' hit "Draggin' the Line".  It reached #19 in Canada and #40 on the Billboard Hot 100 in 1971.  It was featured on his 1971 album, Christian of the World.

The song was produced by James and King and arranged by Jimmy Wisner.

References

1971 songs
1971 singles
Songs written by Tommy James
Tommy James songs
Roulette Records singles